Isikeli Vuruna (born 27 January 1988 at Taveuni, Fiji) is a Fijian rugby union footballer. He was a member of the Lelean Memorial School 'Dream Team' of 2006 that won the Deans Trophy in the Fiji Secondary Schools Rugby Union Deans competition on 19 August of that year. The 2006 Lelean Dream Team also had players like Iliesa Keresoni and brothers Peni Rokodiva and Tomasi Mawi.

He has also played in the national age group teams for Fiji in the Fiji Secondary Schools team of 2006 that played against the Australian Schoolboys on 30 September 2006.

Vuruna was selected and played for the Fiji Under 19 Team in the 2007 Under 19 Rugby World Championship that was held in Ireland and the Fiji Under 20 Team in the 2008 IRB Junior World Championship, held in England.

He played at wing for the Fiji A Team against the Tonga A Team in 2007.

Vuruna was selected for national duties in the Fiji National Sevens Team in the IRB Sevens World Series in 2012 playing for the victorious Fiji Sevens Teams in the Hong Kong and London tournaments.

Vuruna is a naval officer in the Fiji Navy and plays for the Fiji Navy Club and for Suva in the Fiji Rugby Union's Provincial Competition.

References

External links
 Fiji Rugby Union Player Profile
 Vuruna to debut in Hong Kong
 Fiji Times Report: Vrooom!

1988 births
Living people
People educated at Lelean Memorial School
People from Taveuni
I-Taukei Fijian people
Rugby union wings